Lunca Bradului is a commune in Mureș County, Transylvania, Romania. It is composed of three villages: Lunca Bradului, Neagra (Nyágra) and Sălard (Szalárd).

The right tributary Ilva flows into the Mureș at the village.

See also
List of Hungarian exonyms (Mureș County)

References

Communes in Mureș County
Localities in Transylvania